In probability theory, Cantelli's inequality (also called the Chebyshev-Cantelli inequality and the one-sided Chebyshev inequality) is an improved version of Chebyshev's inequality for one-sided tail bounds. The inequality states that, for 

 

where

 is a real-valued random variable,
 is the probability measure,

Applying the Cantelli inequality to  gives a bound on the lower tail,

 

While the inequality is often attributed to Francesco Paolo Cantelli who published it in 1928, it originates in Chebyshev's work of 1874. When bounding the event random variable deviates from its mean in only one direction (positive or negative), Cantelli's inequality gives an improvement over Chebyshev's inequality. The Chebyshev inequality has "higher moments versions" and "vector versions", and so does the Cantelli inequality.

Comparison to Chebyshev's inequality 

For one-sided tail bounds, Cantelli's inequality is better, since Chebyshev's inequality can only get

 

On the other hand, for two-sided tail bounds, Cantelli's inequality gives

 

which is always worse than Chebyshev's inequality (when ; otherwise, both inequalities bound a probability by a value greater than one, and so are trivial).

Proof

Let  be a real-valued random variable with finite variance  and expectation , and define  (so that  and ).

Then, for any , we have
 
the last inequality being a consequence of Markov's inequality. By differentiating, this can be seen to be , leading to
  if

Generalizations

Various stronger inequalities can be shown.
He, Zhang, and Zhang showed (Corollary 2.3)  when
 and :

 

In the case  this matches a bound in Berger's "The Fourth Moment Method",
 
This improves over Cantelli's inequality in that we can get a non-zero lower bound, even when .

See also
 Chebyshev's inequality
 Paley–Zygmund inequality

References

Probabilistic inequalities